Bryantsville is an unincorporated community in Spice Valley Township, Lawrence County, Indiana.

History
Bryantsville was platted in 1835. It was named in honor of Robert Bryant, a pioneer settler. A post office was established at Bryantsville in 1846, and remained in operation until it was discontinued in 1905.

Geography

References

Unincorporated communities in Lawrence County, Indiana
Unincorporated communities in Indiana